Vetunuavi Charles Hambira (born 3 June 1990) is a Namibian footballer who plays as a centre-back for National First Division side TS Sporting and the Namibia national football team.

Career statistics

International

International goals
As of 4 August 2020. Namibia score listed first, score column indicates score after each Hambira goal.

References

1990 births
Living people
Footballers from Windhoek
Namibia international footballers
Association football central defenders
Black Africa S.C. players
TS Sporting F.C. players
National First Division players
Tura Magic F.C. players
Namibia A' international footballers
2018 African Nations Championship players
Namibian expatriate footballers
Namibian expatriate sportspeople in South Africa
Expatriate soccer players in South Africa
2020 African Nations Championship players
Namibian men's footballers